Fabio Fognini was the defending champion but decided not to participate.
Leonardo Mayer won the title, defeating Alessandro Giannessi 6–3, 6–4 in the final.

Seeds

Draw

Finals

Top half

Bottom half

References
 Main Draw
 Qualifying Draw

Tennislife Cup - Singles
Tennislife Cup